Bald Hill Schoolhouse is a historic one-room school building located at Farmingville in Suffolk County, New York. It was built in 1850 and is a small, one story, vernacular rural schoolhouse with Greek Revival style detailing. It measures approximately 18 feet by 28 feet. It closed for classroom instruction in 1929.  Also on the property are boy's and girl's privies, a small woodshed, and a house formerly owned by a member of the Terry family.

It was added to the National Register of Historic Places in 1988.

The school is located in Farmingville Hills Park and is owned by the Farmingville Hills Historical Society, which plans to operate the schoolhouse as a museum.

References

External links
 Information about the Farmingville Hills Historical Society
 Information about the Bald Hill Schoolhouse

School buildings on the National Register of Historic Places in New York (state)
School buildings completed in 1850
Museums in Suffolk County, New York
One-room schoolhouses in New York (state)
Schoolhouses in the United States
Education museums in the United States
National Register of Historic Places in Suffolk County, New York